The dusky sunbird (Cinnyris fuscus) is a species of bird in the family Nectariniidae. This relatively dull sunbird is found in arid savanna, thickets and shrubland (e.g. Karoo) in Angola, Botswana, Namibia, and South Africa.

References

External links
 Dusky sunbird - Species text in The Atlas of Southern African Birds.

dusky sunbird
Birds of Southern Africa
dusky sunbird
Taxa named by Louis Jean Pierre Vieillot
Taxonomy articles created by Polbot